Rubén Rabanal (1935–1985) was an Argentine politician. He was born in Buenos Aires in 1935 and died on January 23, 1985. He belonged to the Radical Civic Union and was a senator and national congressman several times. His father, Francisco Rabanal, was mayor of Buenos Aires between 1963 and 1966.

Career
Rabanal was a member of radicalism in his youth, graduating as a lawyer and then with a Ph.D. in Political Economy from the University of Buenos Aires. Within his party he held various positions. He was elected senator in 1963, practicing until 1966, when there was a military coup. During his years in the Senate he was also secretary to his father, who was, at that time, mayor of the City of Buenos Aires.

In 1973, upon the return to democracy, after the military government of the Argentine Revolution, he was elected local Member of Parliament and as secretary of the Radical Civic Union block in the House. In 1976, after a new military coup, he was again deposed from office. In 1983, with the return to democracy, he was again elected as Member of Parliament, presiding over the Budget Committee.

In 1984, already ill, he voted for the Treaty of Peace and Friendship between Argentina and Chile.

He finally, died on January 23, 1985, at age 49.

1935 births
Politicians from Buenos Aires
Radical Civic Union politicians
Members of the Argentine Chamber of Deputies elected in Buenos Aires
Members of the Argentine Senate for Buenos Aires
1985 deaths
Burials at La Chacarita Cemetery